Cosmocampus albirostris (white-nose pipefish) is a marine fish of the family Syngnathidae. It is found in the western Atlantic Ocean, along the US coast from North Carolina to Florida, in the Gulf of Mexico, along the Yucatán Peninsula to Cuba, in the Caribbean from Puerto Rico to Grenada, and along Central and South America to southern Brazil. This species is ovoviviparous, with males carrying eggs in a brood pouch and giving birth to live young The Cosmocampus albirostris is a species of pipefish that has been historically collected in the State of Bahia. These species are in the Brazilian list of marine fishes that are authorized to be exported for ornamental purposes. This information was taken from a case study that monitored the ornamental trade of seahorses and pipefishes in Brazil, where harvesting of pipefish is common, and it was also discovered that Cosmocampus albirostris are predominantly harvested in reef areas.

References

Further reading
EOL - whitenose pipefish
iNaturalist - Cosmocampus albirostris

albirostris
Marine fish
Taxa named by Johann Jakob Kaup
Fish described in 1856